Begunjščica is a ridge mountain in the Karawanks. It rises from the western Smokuč mountain pasture to St. Anne on its eastern side. The mountain has three main peaks, the highest being Big Peak. The western Middle Peak lies a little lower, and the lowest is Begunje Mount Vrtača. Its southern slopes rise over the Draga Valley. The ascent of the mountain is relatively easy and possible throughout the year. In the winter and early spring conditions are favourable for ski touring.

Starting points 
 4½ hrs from Begunje, over the Preval Pass and Begunje Mount Vrtača.
 3½–4 hrs from Podljubelj, over the Preval Pass and Begunje Mount Vrtača.
 2½ hrs from the Zelenica Lodge and across the Slovene Mountain Hiking Trail.
 1 hr from the Roblek Lodge at Begunjščica, across the Slovene Mountain Hiking Trail.

Panoramic view 
There is a nice panoramic view from the summit. Towards the west there is Bohinj with its lake, Lake Bled, and Triglav. The Martuljek Group with Škrlatica, Stol, Vrtača and Košuta can be seen to the north. On the eastern side lie the Kamnik Savinja Alps with Storžič prominent, and the Ljubljana Basin can be seen to the south.

Manganese ore
Begunjščica was once an important mining area for manganese ore in Slovenia. These mines contributed to 79% of all Slovene manganese ores processed in the ironworks of Jesenice. They were used in 1872 by the engineer Lambert von Pantz to make ferromanganese, a manganese and iron alloy, in a blast furnace, with significantly higher manganese content than was previously possible (37% instead of the previous 12%). This won the Carniolan Industrial Company 22 international recognitions, including a gold medal at the 1873 World Exposition in Vienna and an award at the Centennial Exposition in Pennsylvania in 1876. The manganese ore was dug at Begunjščica until 1915. Altogether  were dug, containing on average 30% manganese.

References

External links 
 
 Photos, Route and Description
 Begunjščica on summitpost.com

Karawanks
Mountains of the Alps
Mountains of Upper Carniola
Manganese mines
Mines in Slovenia
Ridges of Slovenia
Two-thousanders of Slovenia